The 2018 British Academy Television Awards took place on 13 May 2018 at the Royal Festival Hall in London.

The nominations were announced on 4 April, with Line of Duty leading with four awards. Black Mirror, The Crown and Three Girls followed with three nominations.

The 2018 British Academy Television Craft Awards were held on 22 April 2018.

Winners and nominees

Programmes with multiple nominations

Most major wins

In Memoriam

Ken Dodd
Rosemary Leach
Peter Hall
Elizabeth Dawn
Jim Bowen
Robert Hardy
Brian Cant
Liz MacKean
Barry Norman
Mark Milsome
Anthony Booth
Keith Chegwin
Rodney Bewes
William G. Stewart
Peter Sallis
Katie Boyle
Roy Barraclough
Sean Hughes
Patricia Llewellyn
Dale Winton
Emma Chambers
Peter Wyngarde
Emma Tennant
John Noakes
Benjamin Whitrow
Doreen Keogh
Bruce Forsyth

Notes
BAFTA Award for Best Short Form Programme is added in this year.

References

External links
Official website

British Academy Television Awards
2018 awards in the United Kingdom
2018 in British television
May 2018 events in the United Kingdom
Royal Festival Hall
2018 television awards